The Siren of Seville is a 1924 American silent adventure film directed by Jerome Storm and Hunt Stromberg, and starring Priscilla Dean.

Plot
As described in a review in a film magazine, Gallito (Forrest), a Spanish peasant lad, longs to be a matador. Chance brings the great bull fighter Pedro (Betz) past his farm as he is fighting a fake bull and he is amused. Gallito’s sweetheart Dolores (Dean) resents this but on learning Pedro’s identity makes him promise to help Gallito. Later, they journey to Seville, Pedro has forgotten his promise but Dolores threatens to cut off his pigtail if he does not make good. The rumpus attracts Cavillo (Holmes), the president of the association who to further his own ends aids Pedro. Ardito (De Lorez), a vamp, proves false to Pedro, and he is killed by a bull. Gallito wins and is acclaimed the new hero. He neglects Dolores and becomes the companion of Ardito. Dolores accepts Cavallo’s friendship and wins success as a dancer. Cavallo tries to attack her but Gallito saves her, and contrite tries to get her forgiveness but she repulses him. She learns that Cavallo intends to drug Gallito before he goes into the ring, bringing about his death, and goes to Ardito who locks her in her apartment. After a fierce fight with Ardito, Dolores escapes and reaches the ring in time to rush in and kill the bull thus saving Gallito. She and Gallito become reconciled and when she tells of Cavallo’s perfidy the mob turns on him.

Cast

Preservation
A copy of The Siren of Seville is preserved in the foreign archive EYE Institute in Amsterdam.

References

External links

Still at silenthollywood.com

1924 films
American silent feature films
Films directed by Jerome Storm
1924 adventure films
American adventure films
American black-and-white films
Producers Distributing Corporation films
1920s American films
Silent adventure films
1920s English-language films